Clones of Clones is an American indie rock band from Washington, D.C. composed of members Ben Payes, Todd Evans, Nick Scialli, and Brian Abbott.  On their debut EP, the band worked with producer Justin Long (U.S. Royalty).  They have played shows alongside bands such as Sam Roberts Band, The Trews, SomeKindaWonderful, and Saintseneca.

History

Formation and influences 
In the summer of 2012, after their former band The Blue Line dissolved, Payes, Scialli, and then-guitarist Dave Chaletzky recruited drummer Brian Abbott to start a new musical project.  The name "Clones of Clones" was conceived as an ironic play on words; Payes has stated that they have always strived for "uniqueness with a hint of familiarity."  The band recorded the "Neighborhoods" EP and began playing shows to support its release.

In early 2013, Chaletzky left the band and was replaced by Todd Evans of Florida's A New Way To Live Forever, completing the current line-up.

Name meaning 
The band name Clones of Clones was conceived as a way of expressing frustration with the artistic cycle of copying and reproducing pre-existing ideas at the expense of risk-taking novelty. According to Payes, "Nothing is completely original...I’m not sure things have been original for awhile. I envision a clone to be a less perfect version of its former self.”

"Neighborhoods" EP (2013) 
Shortly after forming in Summer 2012, Clones of Clones recorded the "Neighborhoods" EP with Justin Long (U.S. Royalty) in Potomac, MD.  The EP was released in early 2013 with the following track listing:
 The Neighborhood
 Bully
 Homie
 Take Care of Yourself

"Mr. Sanity" single (2013) 
The band continued its work with Justin Long in 2013, recording the single "Mr. Sanity."  This was the first material recorded with Evans in the band.

I Don't Need Your Love (2014) 
The title track "I Don't Need Your Love" was released along with "Out Loud" and "The Battle Between" on November 11, 2014.

Band members 
 Ben Payes - Guitar, synth, vocals
 Todd Evans - Guitar, synth, vocals
 Nick Scialli - Bass, guitar, vocals
 Brian Abbott - Drums

Former members 
 Dave Chaletzky - Guitar, vocals

Discography 
 "Neighborhoods" EP (2013)
 "Mr. Sanity" Single (2013)
 "I Don't Need Your Love" Single (2014)
 "Monster Heart" Album (2015)
 “That Wasn’t Me” EP (2017)

Singles

Notable performances 
Since releasing their "Neighborhoods" EP, Clones of Clones has toured in Washington, D.C. and nearby mid-atlantic states.  The band has played four shows in Washington, D.C. opening for nationally and internationally touring acts.

References

External links 
 Official Website

Indie rock musical groups from Washington, D.C.
Musical groups established in 2012
2012 establishments in Washington, D.C.